The Brutus Network was a French Resistance movement during World War II. It was founded in 1941 by Pierre Fourcaud, parachuted in France with instructions from Charles de Gaulle to set up an intelligence network, and other socialist members of the French Section of the Workers' International (SFIO), from the Bouches-du-Rhône department in the Southern Zone, and led by Félix Gouin. As soon as July 1941, the network almost became the armed wing of the Comité d'action socialiste (CAS - Socialist Action Committee), of which Félix Gouin had been a co-founder, along with Daniel Mayer. The CAS delegate Eugène Thomas became the leader of the Brutus Network after the arrest of Pierre Fourcaud and the departure of his brother, Jean Fourcaud, for London.

Extending itself in 1942–43, Brutus became a national Resistance network in February 1943, in particular through the impulsion of André Boyer. Boasting more than 1,000 agents, its headquarters were in Lyon, with Pierre Sudreau as responsible of the Northern Zone and Jean-Maurice Hermann of the Southern Zone. André Boyer entered the directing committee of the Mouvements unis de Résistance (United Movements of Resistance) in November 1943. At the end of this year, the network was strongly affected by the arrest of Boyer, Sudreau, and Hermann. Gaston Defferre, later mayor of Marseilles for years, succeeded to André Boyer (he was previously his deputy) as national chief.

Some members 
Jean-Louis Bazerque
 Pierre Bourthoumieux
 Jean Biondi
 Élie Bloncourt
 André Boyer
 André Clavé
 Gaston Defferre
 Pierre Fourcaud
 Raymond Gernez
 Félix Gouin
 Ginette Kahn Bernheim
 Jean-Maurice Hermann
 Pierre Malafosse
 Daniel Mayer
 Émilienne Moreau
 Jacques Poupault
 Georges Ronceray
 Pierre Sudreau
 Eugène Thomas
 Jean Valnet
 Gaston Vedel

Footnotes

Bibliography 
Jean-Marc Binot and Bernard Boyer, Nom de code : Brutus, éd. Fayard, 2007

See also 
Vichy France
French Section of the Workers' International

External links 
Témoignage, video testimony of a Brutus member in Annecy

French Resistance networks and movements
French Section of the Workers' International